Women & Infants Hospital of Rhode Island is a women and infants' hospital in Providence, Rhode Island. It is the primary teaching hospital in obstetrics, gynecology, and newborn pediatrics of the Warren Alpert Medical School at Brown University. In 1996, Women & Infants Hospital was a founding member (along with Butler Hospital and Kent Hospital) of the Care New England Health System.

History
Women & Infants Hospital was founded in 1884 as the Providence Lying-In Hospital, which was exclusively a maternity hospital where women could safely deliver babies.

The hospital was initially located at the General James Estate on Slocum Street in Providence, Rhode Island, but it was moved two years later to the corner of State and Field streets after it outgrew its initial building. It was moved again in 1926 to 50 Maude Street, where it remained for 60 years. Women & Infants continued to expand and modernize over the years, and it became affiliated with Rhode Island Hospital in the late 1970s. The hospital was moved once again in 1986 to its current location on Dudley Street in the Upper South Providence neighborhood in order to further facilitate future physical expansion and program developments.

In 1996, Women & Infants Hospital joined with Butler Hospital and Kent Hospital to create the Care New England Health System.

Current operations
Women & Infants Hospital is the largest obstetrical facility in Rhode Island, the second largest in New England, and the tenth in the United States. Nearly 3,000 employees including 800 medical staff handle over 30,000 emergency room visits, 23,000 hospital admissions, and 9,300 deliveries per year. The Special Care Nursery, the only newborn intensive care unit in the region, treats 1,200 babies a year. In addition, more than 8,000 procedures are done per year in the gynecological and general surgical program, which provides a comprehensive array of services that meet the needs of women throughout their lifespan.

The hospital offers services in infertility treatment, breast care, gynecologic cancer, urinary incontinence, and prenatal diagnosis at the main hospital building and at nearby satellite facilities. Women & Infants also offers educational programs and medical, nutritional, and support services through the Women's Primary Care Center and outreach sites in East Greenwich, Woonsocket, South Kingstown, Swansea, Massachusetts, and North Attleboro, Massachusetts.

In addition to being the primary affiliate in obstetrics, gynecology, and newborn pediatrics for the Brown Medical School, Women & Infants maintains its commitment to medical education and research through relationships with various nursing and professional schools.

A five-story addition that will offer more obstetrical beds and a larger NICU, offering individual rooms for each family, is scheduled for completion in late 2009.

Mark R. Marcantano is the President and Chief Operating Officer of the hospital.

Awards, recognition and grants
 Named one of the top 50 hospitals in gynecology in the America's Best Hospitals edition of U.S. News & World Report in 2000, 2001 and 2004.
 Women & Infants and Brown University were named a National Center of Excellence in Women's Health by the U.S. Department of Health and Human Services in 2003.
 $9 million Center of Biomedical Research Excellence (COBRE) National Institute of Health grant in perinatal biology.
 $2 million grant from the National Institute of Child Health and Human Development for the study of fetal death.

See also
List of hospitals in Rhode Island

References

External links
Official Website

Hospital buildings completed in 1886
Hospital buildings completed in 1926
Hospitals in Rhode Island
Maternity hospitals in the United States
Buildings and structures in Providence, Rhode Island
Brown University
1884 establishments in Rhode Island
Women in Rhode Island
Hospitals established in 1884
Children's hospitals in the United States
Women's hospitals